This is a list of notable events in country music that took place in the year 1996.

Events
June 28 — First annual Country Stampede Music Festival begins
 October 6 — Tim McGraw and Faith Hill are married, and quickly become country music's most visible couple. Their friendship grew into romance during their successful "Spontaneous Combustion" tour that year.

Top hits of the year

Singles released by American artists

Singles released by Canadian artists

Top new album releases

Other top albums

Births
 July 23 – Danielle Bradbery, winner of  season four of NBC's The Voice.

Deaths
 February 17 — Gus Hardin, 50, female singer best known for her Earl Thomas Conley duet "All Tangled Up in Love" (automobile accident)
 March 4 — Minnie Pearl, 83, legendary comedian known for her trademark greeting, "How-dee!" and her straw hat with price tag; a regular on Hee Haw (stroke).
 May 3 — Patsy Montana, 87, first female country singer to have a single sell one million copies ("I Want to Be a Cowboy's Sweetheart").
 June 16 — Anthony Armstrong Jones, 47, male singer best known for his Top Ten cover version of "Take a Letter Maria"
 August 22 – Oliver "Doolittle" Lynn, 69, husband of Loretta Lynn and key figure in many aspects of her career.
 December 10 — Faron Young, 64, Nicknamed "The Hillbilly Heartthrob", and "The Singing Sheriff" he had many hits including "Hello Walls" and "Live Fast, Love Hard, Die Young" (suicide).

Hall of Fame inductees

Bluegrass Music Hall of Fame inductees
Peter V. Kuykendall
The Country Gentlemen
Charlie Waller
John Duffey
Eddie Adcock
Tom Gray

Country Music Hall of Fame inductees
Patsy Montana (1908–1996)
Buck Owens (1929–2006)
Ray Price (1926–2013)

Canadian Country Music Hall of Fame inductees
Myrna Lorrie
Larry Delaney

Major awards

Grammy Awards
Best Female Country Vocal Performance — "Blue," LeAnn Rimes
Best Male Country Vocal Performance — "World's Apart", Vince Gill
Best Country Performance by a Duo or Group with Vocal — "My Maria", Brooks & Dunn
Best Country Collaboration with Vocals — "High Lonesome Sound", Vince Gill (featuring Alison Krauss)
Best Country Instrumental Performance — "Jam Man", Chet Atkins
Best Country Song — "Blue", Bill Mack (Performer: LeAnn Rimes)
Best Country Album — The Road to Ensenada, Lyle Lovett (Producers: Billy Williams (singer) and Lyle Lovett)
Best Bluegrass Album — True Life Blues: The Songs of Bill Monroe, Various Artists (Producer: Todd Phillips)

Juno Awards
Country Male Vocalist of the Year — Paul Brandt
Country Female Vocalist of the Year — Shania Twain
Country Group or Duo of the Year — The Rankin Family

Academy of Country Music
Entertainer of the Year — Brooks & Dunn
Song of the Year — "Blue", Bill Mack
Single of the Year — "Blue," LeAnn Rimes
Album of the Year — Blue Clear Sky, George Strait
Top Male Vocalist — George Strait
Top Female Vocalist — Patty Loveless
Top Vocal Duo — Brooks & Dunn
Top Vocal Group — Sawyer Brown
Top New Male Vocalist — Trace Adkins
Top New Female Vocalist — LeAnn Rimes
Top New Vocal Duo or Group — Ricochet
Video of the Year — "I Think About You", Collin Raye (Director: Steven Goldmann)

ARIA Awards 
(presented in Sydney on September 30, 1996)
Best Country Album - Home Fires (The Dead Ringer Band)

Canadian Country Music Association
NCN Fans' Choice Award — Shania Twain
Male Artist of the Year — Charlie Major
Female Artist of the Year — Shania Twain
Group or Duo of the Year — Prairie Oyster
SOCAN Song of the Year — "My Heart Has a History," Paul Brandt, Mark D. Sanders
Single of the Year — "Better Things to Do," Terri Clark
Album of the Year — Terri Clark, Terri Clark
Top Selling Album — Fresh Horses, Garth Brooks
Video of the Year — "(If You're Not in It for Love) I'm Outta Here!," Shania Twain
Vista Rising Star Award — Terri Clark
Vocal Collaboration of the Year — Jim Witter and Cassandra Vasik

Country Music Association
Entertainer of the Year — Brooks & Dunn
Song of the Year — "Go Rest High on That Mountain," Vince Gill
Single of the Year — "Check Yes or No," George Strait
Album of the Year — Blue Clear Sky, George Strait
Male Vocalist of the Year — George Strait
Female Vocalist of the Year — Patty Loveless
Vocal Duo of the Year — Brooks & Dunn
Vocal Group of the Year — The Mavericks
Horizon Award — Bryan White
Music Video of the Year — "My Wife Thinks You're Dead", Junior Brown (Director: Michael McNamara)
Vocal Event of the Year — "I Will Always Love You", Dolly Parton and Vince Gill
Musician of the Year — Mark O'Connor

RPM Big Country Awards
Canadian Country Artist of the Year — Shania Twain
Best Country Album — The Woman in Me, Shania Twain
Best Country Single — "Any Man of Mine", Shania Twain
Top Male Vocalist — Charlie Major
Top Female Vocalist — Shania Twain
Top Group — Prairie Oyster
Outstanding New Artist — Jason McCoy
Top Country Composer(s) — Shania Twain

Further reading
Whitburn, Joel, "Top Country Songs 1944–2005 – 6th Edition." 2005.

Other links
Country Music Association
Inductees of the Country Music Hall of Fame

External links
Country Music Hall of Fame

Country
Country music by year